The Rural Municipality of Storthoaks No. 31 is a rural municipality (RM) in the Canadian province of Saskatchewan within Census Division No. 1 and  Division No. 1.

History 
The RM of Storkoaks No. 31 was originally incorporated as a rural municipality on December 11, 1911. Its name was changed to the RM of Storthoaks No. 31 on March 15, 1912.

Geography

Communities and localities 
The following urban municipalities are surrounded by the RM.

Villages
Storthoaks

The following unincorporated communities are within the RM.

Organized hamlets
Bellegarde

Localities
Fertile

Demographics 

Government 
The RM of Storthoaks No. 31 is governed by an elected municipal council and an appointed administrator that meets on the second Monday of every month. The reeve of the RM is Brian Chicoine while its administrator is Elissa Henrion. The RM's office is located in Storthoaks.

Transportation 
Rail
Estevan Section C.P.R. -- serves Lauder, Bernice, Bede, Broomhill, Tilston, Fertile, Storthoaks, Nottingham, Alida

Roads
Highway 361—serves Storthoaks, Saskatchewan
Highway 8—North south Highway to the west of Storthoaks, Saskatchewan
Highway 600—North south section of the Highway to the east of Storthoaks, Saskatchewan
Highway 361—East West Highway to the east of Storthoaks, Saskatchewan

See also 
List of rural municipalities in Saskatchewan

References 

 
Storthoaks
Division No. 1, Saskatchewan